The Tree Council of Ireland is a voluntary non-governmental organisation. It was formed in 1985 as an umbrella body for organisations involved in the establishment, care and conservation of trees in Ireland, through the promotion of a tree culture in Ireland. 

Its mission statement is to "Foster a Tree Culture in Ireland through Action and Awareness"  Its objectives are threefold: to educate the public about trees, to facilitate networking among members, and to be a representative voice for tree culture and tree promotion.

Its main activities are the organisation of the annual events of National Tree Week in March and National Tree Day on the first Thursday of October. 

The Tree Council of Ireland is a collaborator with the Easy Treesie project, working towards the goal of planting a million trees with Ireland's one million school children and their communities. The project is a response to the challenge by Felix Finkbeiner, founder of Plant-for-the-Planet to the children of the world to plant a million trees in every country as a symbolic and practical act promoting Climate Justice. The project commenced with a pilot project in 2017-2019, expanded with a national initiative held with Science Foundation Ireland where 30,000 trees were planted nationwide during National Science Week 2019. GAA Green Clubs have contributed to achieving this challenge since 2020.

Tree Register of Ireland 
The Tree Register of Ireland (TROI) is a database of Irish trees containing over 10,000 entries. It can currently be found online at trees@treecouncil.ie. Its compilation was initiated in 1999 by the Tree Council of Ireland and the Irish Tree Society. It contains various details on select trees including their height, girth and location. It was compiled on a Geographic Information System (GIS).

The Tree Register may be viewed physically at the National Botanic Gardens (Ireland) or online at trees@treecouncil.ie

The Heritage Tree Register of Ireland is an extension of the Tree Register of Ireland. It is funded by the Irish Heritage Council, the Tree Council of Ireland, the Irish Tree Society and Crann. To qualify for inclusion on the registry a tree must be considered to be of biological, cultural, ecological or historical interest because of its age, size or condition. In order to keep it reasonably up to date, ideally, 10% of the database should be re-measured every year but unfortunately, the updating of this valuable tree resource is on hold due to a lack of funding.
Currently, the Register is expanding at a rate of approximately 1,000 trees each year. 

The Heritage Tree Register may be viewed at the National Botanic Gardens (Ireland).

See also
 Coillte

References

External links

 The Tree Council of Ireland's homepage 

Conservation in the Republic of Ireland
Trees